Vladimir Naumovich Vapnik (born 6 December 1936) is a computer scientist, researcher, and academic. He is one of the main developers of the Vapnik–Chervonenkis theory of statistical learning and the co-inventor of the support-vector machine method and support-vector clustering algorithms.

Early life and education
Vladimir Vapnik was born to a Jewish family in the Soviet Union. He received his master's degree in mathematics from the Uzbek State University, Samarkand, Uzbek SSR in 1958 and Ph.D in statistics at the Institute of Control Sciences, Moscow in 1964. He worked at this institute from 1961 to 1990 and became Head of the Computer Science Research Department.

Academic career
At the end of 1990, Vladimir Vapnik moved to the USA and joined the Adaptive Systems Research Department at AT&T Bell Labs in Holmdel, New Jersey. While at AT&T, Vapnik and his colleagues did work on the support-vector machine, which he also worked on much earlier before moving to the USA. They demonstrated its performance on a number of problems of interest to the machine learning community, including handwriting recognition. The group later became the Image Processing Research Department of AT&T Laboratories when AT&T spun off Lucent Technologies in 1996. In 2000, Vapnik and neural networks expert, Hava Siegelmann developed Support-Vector Clustering, which enabled the algorithm to categorize inputs without labels - becoming one of the most ubiquitous data clustering applications in use. Vapnik left AT&T in 2002 and joined NEC Laboratories in Princeton, New Jersey, where he worked in the Machine Learning group. He also holds a Professor of Computer Science and Statistics position at Royal Holloway, University of London since 1995, as well as a position as Professor of Computer Science at Columbia University, New York City since 2003. As of February 1, 2021, he has an h-index of 86 and, overall, his publications have been cited 226597 times. His book on "The Nature of Statistical Learning Theory" alone has been cited 91650 times.

On November 25, 2014, Vapnik joined Facebook AI Research, where he is working alongside his longtime collaborators Jason Weston, Léon Bottou, Ronan Collobert, and Yann LeCun.
In 2016, he also joined Vencore Labs.

Honors and awards
Vladimir Vapnik was inducted into the U.S. National Academy of Engineering in 2006. He received the 2005 Gabor Award, the 2008 Paris Kanellakis Award, the 2010 Neural Networks Pioneer Award, the 2012 IEEE Frank Rosenblatt Award, the 2012 Benjamin Franklin Medal in Computer and Cognitive Science from the Franklin Institute, the 2013 C&C Prize from the NEC C&C Foundation, the 2014 Kampé de Fériet Award, the 2017 
IEEE John von Neumann Medal. In 2018, he received the Kolmogorov Medal from University of London and delivered the Kolmogorov Lecture. In 2019, Vladimir Vapnik received 
BBVA Foundation Frontiers of Knowledge Award.

Selected publications
 On the uniform convergence of relative frequencies of events to their probabilities, co-author A. Y. Chervonenkis, 1971
 Necessary and sufficient conditions for the uniform convergence of means to their expectations, co-author A. Y. Chervonenkis, 1981
 Estimation of Dependences Based on Empirical Data, 1982
 The Nature of Statistical Learning Theory, 1995
 Statistical Learning Theory (1998). Wiley-Interscience, .
 Estimation of Dependences Based on Empirical Data, Reprint 2006 (Springer), also contains a philosophical essay on Empirical Inference Science, 2006

See also
 Alexey Chervonenkis

References

External links
Photograph of Professor Vapnik
Vapnik's brief biography from the Computer Learning Research Centre, Royal Holloway
Interview by Lex Fridman

Academics of Royal Holloway, University of London
Living people
Columbia University faculty
Columbia School of Engineering and Applied Science faculty
Machine learning researchers
Soviet emigrants to the United States
Soviet computer scientists
Soviet mathematicians
American mathematicians
American computer scientists
Russian Jews
Members of the United States National Academy of Engineering
1936 births
Jewish scientists
Scientists at Bell Labs